Vacherin Fribourgeois (from French, Vacherin of Fribourg) a Swiss semi-hard cheese made from thermised milk. It is produced under Swiss AOC in the canton of Fribourg, where Gruyère also originates. It has a slightly acidic, resiny flavor, akin to Italian Fontina,  with a varying strength depending on the age and type. It is also a basic component lending character to fondues (depending on the recipe). Vacherin Fribourgeois has Swiss AOC status with 6 varieties being available:
 Classic (aged: 6–12 weeks)
 Extra (aged: minimum 12 weeks)
 Rustic (aged: minimum 12 weeks, but up to 25 weeks (6 months))
 Alpage (aged: 12–25 weeks)
 Mountain (aged 9–25 weeks)
 Bio (Organic) (aged: minimum 9 weeks)
The older the vacherin gets, the stronger the smell of ammonia due to microorganism activity in the cheese. Vacherin d'alpage (Alpine Vacherin)  is made from the milk of cows pasturing in alpine meadows and hence has a much richer taste.

See also
List of cheeses
List of Swiss cheeses
Culinary Heritage of Switzerland

References

External links

 
 Making Vacherin Fribourgeois in a Swiss Alpine chalet over wood fire - photoreportage in English

Culinary Heritage of Switzerland
Swiss cheeses
Cow's-milk cheeses
Washed-rind cheeses